The Fiery Priest is a 2019 South Korean television series starring Kim Nam-gil, Kim Sung-kyun, Lee Hanee, Go Jun, and Keum Sae-rok. It was the first drama to air on SBS's Fridays and Saturdays timeslot, airing from February 15 to April 20, 2019.

The Fiery Priest is the highest rated miniseries drama that aired in 2019 on public broadcast according to Nielsen Korea. The drama was a huge success and was one of the most popular dramas aired in 2019. Kim Nam-gil won numerous accolades for his portrayal of a priest with anger management issues. The action comedy drama also featured parodies from other movies and dramas, notably from Mr. Sunshine, Nameless Gangster: Rules of the Time, The Matrix, Reply 1988 and Along with the Gods: The Two Worlds.

Synopsis
Following the mysterious death of an elderly priest, an NIS agent turned priest (Kim Nam-gil) attempts to bring the culprits involved before law. The hilarious journey in taking down the gangsters and corrupt officials in the city is what follows. The journey is not so smooth when the corrupt prosecutor of the city (Lee Hanee) refuses to cooperate.

Cast

Main
 Kim Nam-gil as Kim Hae-il / Michael Kim
 Moon Woo-jin as young Hae-il
An ex-NIS agent who retired after an accident that happened during his last mission. He met Priest Lee and eventually decided to take the path as a priest and hoped for his sins to be forgiven. He was very close to Father Lee and thus is crazy to punish those who killed him. On the contrary to a priest, he is a short-tempered person who would throw a fit each minute. 
 Kim Sung-kyun as Goo Dae-young
A clumsy detective who is a pushover and always manipulated by his superintendent and seniors. Once a dedicated police, his life changed after the death of his former partner.
 Lee Hanee as Park Kyung-sun
A corrupt prosecutor who covered up the crimes of Gudam's administrators including the police chief and head borough. She likes Hae-il for his good-looking face but constantly bickers with him.
 Go Jun as Hwang Cheol-bum
A corrupt businessman who is the step-brother of Gudam's Head of Borough. He runs Daebum Trading and trade illegal things within. Once ranked as number two gangster in Yeosu, he often uses violence to achieve his goal.
 Keum Sae-rok as Seo Seung-ah
A rookie detective at Gudam Police Station who is dedicated in helping Hae-il to reveal the truth behind Priest Lee's death. She secretly has a crush on Hae-il.

Supporting

Local cartel
 Jeong Young-ju as Jung Dong-ja
Gudam's Head of Borough and Hwang Cheol-bum step-sister.
 Kim Hyung-mook as Kang Seok-tae
Chief prosecutor of Gudam and boss of Park Kyung-sun.
 Jung In-gi as Nam Suk-goo
Gudam Police Station's corrupt superintendent and leader of Rising Sun, a nightclub with connections to the cartel.
 Han Gi-jung as Park Won-moo
A corrupt assemblyman representing Gudam.
 Lee Moon-sik as Ki Yong-moon
A con-artist and the leader of a religious cult "Maegak".
 Kim Won-hae as Vladimir Gozhaev
Leader of the Russian gang.

People at the Cathedral and believers
 Jung Dong-hwan as Priest Lee Young-joon
He is looked up as a father figure by Kim Hae-il and is a wise, soft-spoken man. His murder was touted as a suicide.
 Jeon Sung-woo as Han Sung-kyu
A gentle young priest at Gudam's Church. He trained to replace Priest Lee's position after his death. His real name is Han Woo-ram, a famous child actor who starred in an old, popular drama prior to becoming a priest.
 Baek Ji-won as Kim In-kyung
Head nun at Gudam's church who constantly worry about Hae-il boldness in finding the truth. She is revealed to be a former well-known gambler nicknamed Ten-Tailed Fox who blamed herself for her brother's death.
 Ahn Chang-hwan as Song Sac
A young man from Thailand who came to Gudam and work as a delivery boy to support his family. He was often bullied by Jang-ryeong for being a foreigner and best-friend with Oh Yo-han.
 Go Kyu-pil as Oh Yo-han
A cheerful yet chubby part-timer who majored in astronomy but struggles to make a living. He did many part-time work and is best friend with Song Sac.
 Yoon Joo-hee as Bae Hee-jung
A psychiatrist.

People at the Police Station
 Shin Dam-soo as Lee Myung-soo
 Jeon Jeong-gwan as Heo Lig-gu
 Ji Chan as Na Dae-gil
 Kim Kwan-mo as Kim Kyung-ryul

Others
 Kim Min-jae as Lee Jung-gwon
Former NIS agent and Hae-il's team leader.
 Lee Je-yeon as Kim Hoon-suk
 Eum Moon-suk as Jang-ryong
 Kim Joon-ha as altar boy
 Lim Seung-min as altar boy
 Ok Ye-rin as Lim Ji-eun
 Young Ye-na as Hyun-joo
 Jo Ah-in as Eun-ji
 Choi Kwang-je as Anton
 Jung Jae-kwang as Kim Keon-yong
 Jeon Eun-mi as Wangmat Foods staff
 Heo Jae-ho as Gi Hong-chan
The CEO of Great Taste Foods and Yong-moon's cousin. 
 Kang Un as Wangmat Foods manager
 Lee Gyu-ho as Choco
A large chef who works at "Great Taste Foods" and acts as the muscle. Despite his towering size, he is easily knocked out by Hae-il but reemerges as backup later on.
 Cha Chung-hwa as Ahn Dul-ja
 Yoo Kyung-ah as nursery nun
 Song Young-hak as former detective

Special appearances
 Lee Young-bum as Father Kang Matthew (Ep. 1–2)
 Lee Ki-young as Oh Jung-kook (Ep. 6, 33–34)
 Hwang Bum-shik as Kyung-sun’s father (Ep. 16)
 Jung Shi-ah as Maegakkyo believer (Ep. 19)
 Kim Jong-goo as Kim Jong-chul
 Yoo Seung-mok as Oh Kwang-du (Ep. 30–31)
 Jang Ye-won as news announcer
 Kwon Hyeok-soo as President of the Republic of Korea
 Kim Hong-fa as Lee Seok-yoon (Ep. 40)
 Byun Joo-eun as Kim Geom-sa
 Park Eun-kyung as announcer
 Kim Won-gi as prosecutor
 Bang Jun-ho as planning manager

Production
The first script reading took place on October 26, 2018 at the SBS Ilsan Production Center in Tanhyun, South Korea.

The Fiery Priest was first scheduled to air as a Monday-Tuesday drama following My Strange Hero, but due to SBS deciding to cancel the weekend special drama time slot (Saturday nights at 21:05 KST) after Fates & Furies, it became the network's first Friday-Saturday night drama. Haechi was then chosen to follow My Strange Hero.

This series marks Lee Myung-woo's last project for SBS, after 12 years of partnership. In October 2019, he moved to Taewon Entertainment.

Original soundtrack

Part 1

Part 2

Part 3

Part 4

Part 5

Part 6

Viewership

Awards and nominations

Notes

References

External links
  
 
 

Seoul Broadcasting System television dramas
Korean-language television shows
2019 South Korean television series debuts
2019 South Korean television series endings
South Korean comedy television series
South Korean crime television series
Television series by Samhwa Networks